W282CA is a classic country formatted broadcast radio station licensed to and serving Richmond, Virginia.  W282CA is owned by Radio by Grace, Inc., and operated by SummitMedia.

History
On August 7, 2016, W282CA signed on for the first time and began stunting with "Nuthin' but a 'G' Thang", by Dr. Dre featuring Snoop Doggy Dogg, on a loop.  The stunt ended just after Noon, on August 9, and the Classic Hip Hop format began.  Using Westwood One's Classic Hip Hop network, the first song heard on the station was "Rock It" by Master P featuring Weebie and Krazy.

On May 7, 2021, W282CA dropped the classic hip hop format and began simulcasting parent station WKHK's country format.

On January 11, 2022, W282CA changed its format to classic country as "Classic Country 104.3".

Previous logo

References

External links

2016 establishments in Virginia
Radio stations established in 2016
282CA